Yolağzı is a village in the Karacabey district of Bursa Province in Turkey.

It is located 14 km south of Karacabey district.

References 

Villages in Karacabey District